Röke is a locality situated in Hässleholm Municipality, Skåne County, Sweden with 219 inhabitants in 2010.

References 

Populated places in Hässleholm Municipality
Populated places in Skåne County